Adidome is a small town and is the capital of Central Tongu district, a district in the Volta Region of Ghana. According to the Ghana Statistical Service 2010 Population and Housing Census, the population of Adidome was 7,587.

Geography
The Volta River flows close to Adidome on its way into the Atlantic Ocean.

See also
North Tongu (Ghana parliament constituency)
Akatsi College of Education (closest educational institution)
Adidome Farm Institute
Adidome Senior High Secondary School

References

External links and sources
GhanaDistricts

Populated places in the Volta Region